Ellen Plessow (born as Helene Wiemuth Penning on 12 January 1891, in Oldenburg – 2 September 1967, in West Berlin) was a German actress.

Plessow attended the conservatory in Hanover and played in Berlin theatres. Starting in the 1920s she played often amusing roles in silent films.

Filmography
 The Girl from the Rhine (1922)
 His Excellency from Madagascar (1922)
 The Girl with the Mask (1922)
 Debit and Credit (1924)
 Set Me Free (1924)
 A Free People (1925)
 The Farmer from Texas (1925)
 Love and Trumpets (1925)
 The King and the Girl (1925)
 The Morals of the Alley (1925)
 The Telephone Operator (1925)
 Annemarie and Her Cavalryman (1926)
 Marriage Announcement (1926)
 Hunted People (1926)
 The Fiddler of Florence (1926)
 Kissing Is No Sin (1926)
 The Captain from Koepenick (1926)
 Radio Magic (1927)
 Heaven on Earth (1927)
 Volga Volga (1928)
 The Duty to Remain Silent (1928)
 He Goes Right, She Goes Left! (1928)
 Fräulein Else (1929)
 Im Kampf mit der Unterwelt (1930)
 Dolly Gets Ahead (1930)
 The Cabinet of Doctor Larifari (1930)
 Here's Berlin (1932)
 Nanon (1938)
 You and I (1938)
 Salonwagen E 417 (1939)
 Das Mädchen Christine (1949)
 Corinna Schmidt (1951)
 Die Prinzessin und der Schweinehirt (1953)
 Kein Hüsung (1954)
 Pole Poppenspäler (1954)
 Das tapfere Schneiderlein (1956)
 Emilia Galotti (1957)
 Bärenburger Schnurre (1957)

References

External links

 Filmportal.de (german)

German silent film actresses
1891 births
1967 deaths
People from Oldenburg (city)
20th-century German actresses